André-Louis Cholesky (15 October 1875, in Montguyon – 31 August 1918, in Bagneux) was a French military officer, geodesist, and mathematician.

Cholesky was born in Montguyon, France. His paternal family was descendant from the Cholewski family who emigrated from Poland during the Great Emigration.  He attended the Lycée in Bordeaux and entered the École Polytechnique, where Camille Jordan and Henri Becquerel taught.  He worked in geodesy and cartography, and was involved in the surveying of Crete and North Africa before World War I.  He is primarily remembered for the development of a form of matrix decomposition known as the Cholesky decomposition which he used in his surveying work.
He served in the French military as an artillery officer and was killed in battle a few months before the end of World War I; his discovery was published posthumously by his fellow officer Commandant Benoît in the Bulletin Géodésique.

References

Further reading

External links 
 Bulletin de la SABIX, n°39, 2005, André-Louis Cholesky 
 Cholesky's CV at the library of Ecole Polytechnique 
 Claude Brezinski, Dominique Tournès, André-Louis Cholesky, Mathematician, Topographer and Army Officer, Birkhaeuser, 2014.
 Major Cholesky, obituary
 Sur la résolution numérique des systèmes d'équations linéaires, Cholesky 1910 manuscript, online and analyzed on BibNum  [for English, click 'A télécharger']

1875 births
1918 deaths
19th-century French mathematicians
20th-century French mathematicians
École Polytechnique alumni
French military personnel killed in World War I
French geodesists
French topographers